Voivod is the tenth studio album and thirteenth release overall by Canadian thrash metal/progressive metal band Voivod. It is the first since 1993's The Outer Limits to feature returning vocalist Denis Bélanger (Snake) and their first recording with bassist Jason Newsted (Jasonic), formerly of Metallica. It was released in 2003 on Newsted's Chophouse Records label. This is also the last album Voivod completed before guitarist Denis D'Amour (Piggy) died of colon cancer in 2005.

This album is notable for gaining the band greater exposure to a younger audience. A music video was produced for "We Carry On" and received heavy rotation on MTV2's Headbangers Ball and Fuse TV's Uranium upon release. The band was also interviewed on the latter program with Newsted detailing his transition from Metallica to Voivod, a group of which he had been a longtime fan. Voivod also performed on the Second Stage of Ozzfest 2003. This had Newsted assuming bass duties for both Voivod and headlining act, Ozzy Osbourne.

Track listing

Personnel
Voivod
Denis Bélanger aka Snake - vocals
Denis D'Amour aka Piggy - guitar
Jason Newsted aka Jasonic - bass guitar
Michel Langevin aka Away - drums, artwork

Production
Brian Joseph Dobbs - producer, engineer, mixing
Kent Matcke, Leff Lefferts Jr. - digital editing
Enrique Gonzales Muller - editing assistant
George Marino - mastering at Sterling Sound, New York

References

2003 albums
Voivod (band) albums
Surfdog Records albums